Kologrivsky Uyezd (Кологривский уезд) was one of the subdivisions of the Kostroma Governorate of the Russian Empire. It was situated in the northern part of the governorate. Its administrative centre was Kologriv.

Demographics
At the time of the Russian Empire Census of 1897, Kologrivsky Uyezd had a population of 109,575. Of these, 99.9% spoke Russian as their native language.

References

 
Uezds of Kostroma Governorate
Kostroma Governorate